Ray Promontory is the 7 km long and 2.8 km wide promontory lying between Barclay Bay and the New Plymouth sound, and forming the northwest part of Byers Peninsula, Livingston Island in the South Shetland Islands, Antarctica ending up in Start Point and Essex Point.  The promontory's interior is mostly occupied by Dospey Heights.

The feature is part of the Antarctic Specially Protected Area ASPA 126 Byers Peninsula, forming in one of its two restricted zones.

The feature is named after the American Captain Nathaniel Ray, Master of the sealing schooner Harmony which operated in the islands in 1820-21 .

Location

Maps
 Península Byers, Isla Livingston. Mapa topográfico a escala 1:25000. Madrid: Servicio Geográfico del Ejército, 1992. (Map image on p. 55 of the linked study)
 L.L. Ivanov et al. Antarctica: Livingston Island and Greenwich Island, South Shetland Islands. Scale 1:100000 topographic map. Sofia: Antarctic Place-names Commission of Bulgaria, 2005.
 L.L. Ivanov. Antarctica: Livingston Island and Greenwich, Robert, Snow and Smith Islands. Scale 1:120000 topographic map.  Troyan: Manfred Wörner Foundation, 2009.  
 Antarctic Digital Database (ADD). Scale 1:250000 topographic map of Antarctica. Scientific Committee on Antarctic Research (SCAR). Since 1993, regularly upgraded and updated.
 L.L. Ivanov. Antarctica: Livingston Island and Smith Island. Scale 1:100000 topographic map. Manfred Wörner Foundation, 2017.

See also
Rame Bluff, on the southwest side of Ray Promontory

Notes

References
 SCAR Composite Antarctic Gazetteer.

Landforms of Livingston Island
Promontories of Antarctica